Lois Auta (born 29 April 1980) is the founder and chief executive officer at the Cedar Seed Foundation, an organization that promotes the participation of women with disabilities into human rights based development in Nigeria. She focuses on inclusive legislation for people with disabilities.

In 2019, Auta ran for the Federal Capital Territory's AMAC (Abuja Municipal Area Council)/Bwari National Assembly seat , in 2022 she vyed for the Kaduna State House of Assembly seat to represent Kaura constituency under the platform of All Progressives Congress (APC) but lost at the primary to Nehemiah Sunday. She faced discrimination as a female physically challenged politician."

Early life
Auta was born in Jos Plateau, Plateau State, Nigeria, on 29 April 1980 into the Auta Akok family of Kukum Gida Kagoro,

Education 
As a child, Auta contracted polio and was confined to a wheelchair. She holds a diploma and a bachelor's degree in public administration from the University of Abuja, Nigeria. She studied global business administration at Nexford University, based in Washington, DC.

In 2014, she participated in the Young African Leaders Initiative and was selected as a Mandela Washington fellow

Positions
Auta is the founder and executive director of Cedar Seed Foundation.
 President of FCT Disabled Sports Club, Abuja
 Board Member of Federation of  Civil Servants Staff with Disabilities Multipurpose Cooperative Society
 Assistant National Coordinator of Advocacy for Women with Disabilities Initiative
 Board Member of Potters Gallery Initiative
 Member of Joint National Association of Persons with disabilities
 Founder of Ability Africa
 President of Women on Wheels Multipurpose Cooperative Society
 Vice  president of the Mandela Washington Fellowship Alumni Association, Nigeria
In 2019, Auta contested for the Federal Capital Territory's AMAC (Abuja Municipal Area Council)/Bwari National Assembly seat, and in 2022, she vied for the Kaduna State House of Assembly seat to represent Kaura constituency under the platform of the All Progressives Congress (APC), but lost at the primary to Nehemiah Sunday. She faced discrimination as a female, physically challenged politician.

References

External links
 Cedar Seed Foundation website

Living people
Nigerian women company founders
Women chief executives
1980 births
People from Kaduna State